Hank Gilpin is an American furniture maker and wood sculptor. He is known for using distinctive types of wood. His work is in the collection of the Museum of Fine Arts, Boston. Having worked under Tage Frid while studying at the Rhode Island School of Design, Gilpin owns and operates a woodworking shop in Lincoln, Rhode Island.

References

External links

Living people
American furniture designers
20th-century American sculptors
People from Providence County, Rhode Island
Rhode Island School of Design alumni
1946 births
21st-century American sculptors